CW 9 or CW9 may refer to the following:

Television stations in the United States affiliated with The CW

Current
KECY-DT3 in El Centro, California / Yuma, Arizona
KIMA-DT2 in Yakima, Washington (cable channel, broadcasts on channel 29.2)
KEPR-DT2, semi-satellite of KIMA-TV (cable channel, broadcasts on channel 19.2)
WAOW-DT2 in Central Wisconsin
WNCT-DT2 in Eastern North Carolina, second digital sub-channel of WNCT-TV

Former
KCWK in Walla Walla, Washington (CW affiliated from 2006 to 2008)
KNIN-TV in Caldwell / Boise, Idaho (CW affiliated from 2006 to 2011)
KWES-DT2 in Odessa / Midland, Texas (CW Plus affiliated from 2013 to 2019)
WGN-TV in Chicago, Illinois (CW affiliated from 2006 to 2016)

Other uses
A postcode district in the CW postcode area in Cheshire, England